On 7 May 2011, during the civil uprising phase of the Syrian civil war, the Syrian military launched an operation in the Syrian city of Baniyas. The government said it was targeting terrorist groups, while the Syrian opposition called it a crackdown against pro-democracy protesters. The operation lasted until 14 May 2011.

Prelude

On 9 April 2011, unknown gunmen shot at a military bus traveling through Baniyas, killing nine soldiers.

On 10 April, protests were held in Baniyas in which violent clashes erupted between security forces and protesters. Between three and six people were reportedly shot dead, while one police officer was reportedly killed by unknown gunmen.

On 14 April, snipers killed a Syrian Army soldier in the city, according to state media.

The operation

On 7 May, preceded by the successful operation against protestors in Daraa days prior, Syrian Army units entered Baniyas from three directions. They advanced into Sunni districts of the multi-ethnic town. Heavy gunfire was reported as the operation began. The next day, 8 May, around 30 tanks were seen patrolling the city, with some of them positioned in the city center. Syrian Navy boats were also reportedly holding positions near the city's coastline. Special forces units allegedly entered the northern part of the city, from where heavy gunfire was heard.

On 14 May, the military began to withdraw from the city, effectively ending the siege.

See also

References

External links
By All Means Necessary!, Human Rights Watch, 16 December 2011

Baniyas Siege
Baniyas
2011 in Syria
Military operations of the Syrian civil war involving the Syrian government
May 2011 events in Syria